Brandywine Township is one of fourteen townships in Shelby County, Indiana. As of the 2010 census, its population was 2,015 and it contained 843 housing units.

Brandywine Township was organized in 1843.

Geography

The township contains Brandywine Creek.

Cities and towns
 Fairland

Unincorporated towns
 Clover Village

References

External links
 Indiana Township Association
 United Township Association of Indiana

Townships in Shelby County, Indiana
Townships in Indiana